Shakera Casandra Selman (born 1 September 1989) is a Barbadian cricketer who plays as a right-arm medium bowler. In October 2018, Cricket West Indies (CWI) awarded her a women's contract for the 2018–19 season. Later the same month, she was named in the West Indies' squad for the 2018 ICC Women's World Twenty20 tournament in the West Indies. In January 2020, she was named in West Indies' squad for the 2020 ICC Women's T20 World Cup in Australia. In May 2021, Selman was awarded with a central contract from Cricket West Indies. She plays domestic cricket for Barbados and Barbados Royals, and has previously played for Surrey, Trailblazers and Supernovas.

In October 2021, she was named in the West Indies team for the 2021 Women's Cricket World Cup Qualifier tournament in Zimbabwe. In February 2022, she was named in the West Indies team for the 2022 Women's Cricket World Cup in New Zealand. In July 2022, she was named in the Barbados team for the cricket tournament at the 2022 Commonwealth Games in Birmingham, England.

References

External links

1989 births
Barbadian women cricketers
Living people
West Indian women cricketers
West Indies women One Day International cricketers
West Indies women Twenty20 International cricketers
West Indian women cricket captains
Surrey women cricketers
IPL Trailblazers cricketers
IPL Supernovas cricketers
Barbados Royals (WCPL) cricketers
Cricketers at the 2022 Commonwealth Games
Commonwealth Games competitors for Barbados
Barbados women Twenty20 International cricketers